Así en el barrio como en el cielo (English: So in the neighborhood as in heaven) is a Mexican telenovela produced by Fides Velasco for TV Azteca.  It is an original story of Guillermo Ríos, Leticia López Margalli and Eugenio Derbez.

Marcela Guirado, Luciano Zacharsky and José Alonso star as the protagonists, with the antagonistic participation of Patricia Bernal.

The storyline includes the legendary Avándaro rock festival ("The Mexican Woodstock") of 1971 as its background.

Cast 
 Juan Manuel Bernal as Jesús El Gallo López 
 Verónica Merchant as Aurora de Ferrara
 Patricia Bernal as Francesca Ferrara
 José Alonso as Expedito López 
 Marcela Guirado as María López
 Luciano Zacharsky as Octavio Ferrara
 Fernando Luján as Marcelo Ferrara
 Bárbara del Regil as Lucía Fernanda Mercado
 Mariana Torres as Jacky López
 Roberta Burns as Bernarda López
 Carmen Delgado as La Pechu
 Alejandro Cuetara as Héctor Ferrara
 Armando Torrea as Flavio Ferrara
 Gerardo Lama as Patricio Ferrara
 Fran Meric as Casandra Legarreta
 Itari Marta as Verónica Ferrara
 Paloma Woolrich as Jacinta López
 Héctor Kotsifakis as Demóstenes
 Ximena Ramos as Paola "Pollola" Lopez
 Alenka Rios as Heidy Castro
 Alma Rosa Añorve as Joaquína
 Luis Carlos Muñoz as Kevin
 Pablo Portillo as Donky
 Rodolfo Valdés as Claudio
 Hugo Albores - El Enchilado
 Abel Fernando - El Bulldog
 Alessandra Pozzo - Yolanda
 Carlos Álvarez - Dr. Briseño
 Guillermo Ríos - Anselmo Chavero / Antonio
 Marliese Edelmann - Sofía
 Greg Kaufmann as Alfin
 Mariana Castillo as Franccesca Ferrara (Young)
 Karelly Gillies as Extra "Daira"
 Valeria Lorduguin as Perla

References

External links 

 Official website

Spanish-language telenovelas
TV Azteca telenovelas
Mexican telenovelas
2015 telenovelas
2015 Mexican television series debuts
2015 Mexican television series endings